A dance cover is a video clip uploaded on a video-sharing service in which dancers re-enact the choreography of an original music video or, one's own choreography that's different from the original. The cover dance culture began in earnest around 2011 when Kpop Cover Dance spread on YouTube.In Korea, the K-POP Cover Dance Festival is held every year, and Kpop cover dance teams from all over the world compete for their skills.

Several famous dance cover groups exist, primarily on YouTube, such as Flowtaee, Spice Team,  WAVEYA Dance Group and I Love Dance.

References

Dance culture
Music videos